Wolf's Return is the third full-length album by Swedish heavy metal band Grand Magus. It was released in Europe and in the United States on 14 June 2005.

Track listing
 "Kingslayer" – 4:10
 "Nine" – 3:27
 "Blodörn" – 1:11
 "Wolf's Return" – 4:51
 "Blood Oath" – 4:41
 "Järnbörd" – 1:09
 "Repay in Kind" – 5:11
 "Hämnd" – 1:34
 "Ashes" – 4:37
 "Light Hater" – 4:53
 "Wolf's Return Part II" – 2:30

Japanese edition bonus track
 "Brotherhood of Sleep" (Live)

Personnel 
Janne "JB" Christoffersson – vocals, guitars
Mats "Fox" Skinner – bass
Fredrik "Trisse" Liefendahl – drums

References

External links
 Grand Magus

2005 albums
Grand Magus albums
Rise Above Records albums